Ulloor S. Parameswara Iyer (Malayalam: ഉള്ളൂർ എസ്. പരമേശ്വര അയ്യർ; 6 June 1877 – 15 June 1949), born Sambasivan but popularly known as  Ulloor, was an Indian poet of Malayalam literature and a historian. He was one of the modern triumvirate poets of Kerala in the first half of the 20th century, along with Kumaran Asan and Vallathol Narayana Menon. Umakeralam, a mahakavya, and Kerala Sahitya Charitram, a comprehensive history of the Malayalam language are two of his most important works.

Biography 

Ulloor was born on 6 June 1877 at Thamarassery Illam in Perunna, Changanassery in the south Indian state of Kerala to Subramania Iyer and Bhagavathi Ammal. His early schooling was at Changanassery but his father died when he was young. The family shifted to Thiruvananthapuram in 1890, where his mother raised him. He graduated with Honors in Philosophy from Maharajas College in 1897 and joined the Travancore State Services. He continued his studies and took a graduate degree in Law and master's degrees in Malayalam and Tamil. He held various positions in the government service such as those of a Land revenue and Income Tax Commissioner before superannuating from service as the Chief Secretary of the State.

Iyer married Ananthalakshmi Ammal in 1892 when he was only 15 years old but his wife died in 1903. Subsequently, he married Subbammal in 1905, who died in 1930. He had three daughters and five sons from his two marriages. He died on June 15, 1949, aged 72.

Legacy 

Iyer assumed his name, Ulloor, after the place of his ancestral home. Unlike the other two members of the modern triumvirates, Kumaran Asan and Vallathol Narayana Menon, who were romanticists, Ulloor was known to be a classicist and his works were marked by Sanskrit words, mythological references, satirical undertones and scholarship. One of his most notable works was published in 1914, a mahakavya titled Umakeralam when the language had only one complete mahakavya until then, Rukmamgadacharitham of Pandalam Kerala Varma. Poet K. Ayyappa Paniker noted that Umakeralam was a work of great devotion: devotion to the land, to the language, to a poetic tradition. He also wrote short narratives or khandakavyas and Karnabhooshanam and Pingala are two notable works in that genre; the former an account of Karna's generosity and dedication to principles while the latter is a portrayal of the transformation of a courtesan overnight into a pious and saintly character. Some of his other best known works were Bhakthideepika, and Chithrasala. Uloor also wrote quite a large number of lyrics and shorter pieces, now available in various collections. The most noted of his historical works was Kerala Sahitya Charitram, which narrates the history of Malayalam language, culture, and literature and the book was published by the University of Travancore in five volumes after the writer's death. The first three volumes were published respectively in 1953, 1954 and 1955. The last two volumes were published in 1957. He did research on ancient literature and palm leaf manuscripts and was successful in discovering works such as Rama Charitham poem and Doothavakyam prose. Besides, he wrote a play, Amba and such other works in prose as Bashachampukkal, a study on Champu literature and Vijnana Deepika, a compilation of essays in four volumes. He also wrote poems for children and the popular song, Kakke, Kakke, Koodevide is one among them.

Honours 
The Government of Kerala established Mahakavi Ulloor Memorial Library and Research Centre in 1956, to honour the memory of the poet, and it was shifted to a new premises in Jagathy, Thiruvananthapuram in 1966 which was inaugurated by S. Radhakrishnan, the then president of India. The institution which houses a research centre and a public library, became the first open university in Kerala for non-formal education in 1978, offering courses in Sanskrit, Malayalam literature, poetry and telecasting. It has also instituted an annual literary award, Ulloor Award, to recognise excellence in Malayalam poetry. The India Post released a commemorative stamp in 1980, depicting his portrait. On May 15, 1981, the then Indian President Neelam Sanjeeva Reddy unveiled a full size statue of Ulloor in the premises of the State Central Library, Kerala, at Palayam, Thiruvananthapuram.

Works

Poetry

Prose

Translations into other languages

Works on Ulloor

Trivia 
 His name at birth was Sambasivan and but was called by his family as Parameshwaran.
 K. Subramaniam, the director of Prahlada, the 1941 Malayalam movie, was the nephew of Ulloor.

References

External links
 
 
 
 

1877 births
1949 deaths
Writers from Thiruvananthapuram
People from Changanassery
Malayalam-language writers
Indian male poets
20th-century Indian historians
Indian Sanskrit scholars
Hindu poets
20th-century Indian philosophers
Poets from Kerala
19th-century Indian historians
19th-century Indian poets
20th-century Indian poets
20th-century Indian male writers
History of Changanassery
Poets in British India
Historians in British India